Diego Velásquez (born 22 November 1987) is a Colombian professional golfer who currently plays on PGA Tour Latinoamérica.

Amateur career
Velásquez represented Oregon State University while at college becoming the first player from Oregon State to be a first team All-American player.

During his time at college, Velásquez won several amateur events including the 2008 Giustina Memorial Classic, the 2009 Western Intercollegiate and the 2010 Bank of Tennessee Intercollegiate.

Professional career
On finishing college in 2010, Velásquez turned professional. He played eight events on the Nationwide Tour in 2011 through sponsor exemptions with a best finish of sixth place at the Miccosukee Championship. By finishing 98th on the money list, he earned status for 2012.

In 2012, Velásquez continued to play on the Web.com Tour but failed to retain his playing rights and has played on PGA Tour Latinoamérica since 2013.

In March 2015, Velásquez recorded his first Official World Golf Ranking event win at the 2015 Avianca Colombian Open.

Amateur wins
 2008 Giustina Memorial Classic
 2009 Western Intercollegiate
 2010 Bank of Tennessee Intercollegiate.

Professional wins (2)

PGA Tour Latinoamerica wins (1)

PGA Tour Latinoamerica Developmental Series wins (1)

Team appearances
Amateur
 Eisenhower Trophy (representing Colombia): 2008

References

External links
 
 

Colombian male golfers
Oregon State Beavers men's golfers
PGA Tour Latinoamérica golfers
PGA Tour golfers
Sportspeople from Bogotá
1987 births
Living people
21st-century Colombian people